Oliver Dvojakovski (born January 26, 1997) in Berovo is a Macedonian professional basketball player for Pelister of the Macedonian First League.

Career
He started his youth basketball career in Spain.

He played for the youth categories of Real Betis.

From 2015 to 2018 he played in L Alfas - P.N. Serra Gelada and Santo Domingo Betanzos in Liga EBA.

He has also played for the youth categories of Macedonia national team.

In 2018 he returns to Macedonia and continues his career in AV Ohrid.

In the 2019/2020 season he played for Kumanovo.

In  November 2020 he signed a contract with Akademija FMP. 

From July 2022 he is a new basketball player of Pelister.

References

1997 births
Living people
Macedonian men's basketball players